Våga is a small village in Sveio municipality in Vestland county, Norway. The village is located on the east side of Viksefjorden, along the county border with Rogaland.

References

Villages in Vestland
Sveio